Pelodiaetodes is a genus of ground beetles in the family Carabidae. There are about five described species in Pelodiaetodes, found in New Zealand.

Species
These five species belong to the genus Pelodiaetodes:
 Pelodiaetodes aldermensis Sokolov, 2015
 Pelodiaetodes constricticollis Sokolov, 2015
 Pelodiaetodes moorei Sokolov, 2015
 Pelodiaetodes nunni Sokolov, 2015
 Pelodiaetodes prominens B.Moore, 1980

References

External links

External links
 iNaturalist

Trechinae